Basti-Abdullah Shaheed literally meaning "Settlement of Abdullah" is a Town situated a short distance from Rojhan in Rajanpur District, the border district of Punjab province in Pakistan.

The town is named after Maulana Muhammad Abdullah and is also noted for being the resting place of Abdul Rashid Ghazi.

Etymology

The town, in flat, cotton-growing area, was named after Maulana Muhammad Abdullah, after he arranged for a railway station to be established there.

Education 

In 2002, a religious school, was established by Abdul Rashid Ghazi, which was named Madrasa Abdullah Bin Ghazi.

It is a branch of Jamia Faridia University, Islamabad where students are taught Hifz (memorizing the Noble Qur'an) and Tajwid (Quranic Phonetics), as of 2021 the seminary has 130 students.

Abdul Rashid Ghazi Grave 
The town and the Madrasa came into the limelight on July 11 2007 when hundreds of people gathered in the town for the funeral and burial of Abdul Rashid Ghazi who was killed when security forces stormed his mosque complex after a week-long standoff.

Railway Station

In 1973, a railway station was established in the town called Basti Abdullah railway station.

Demographics

Languages 
Balochi Language is the most widely spoken language in Basti Abdullah.

References

Populated places in Rajanpur District